Amable Bapaume (26 March 1825 – 7 July 1895) was a 19th-century French novelist, journalist and playwright.

Biography 
In 1847, he published a first novel, Juana la Lionne. In the 1860s, under the pen name "Henri Normand", he had several comédies en vaudeville published, most of them written in collaboration with Jean-Louis-Auguste Commerson, then director of le Tintamarre. Having abandoned teaching, Bapaume contributed a number of humorous articles to this newspaper, including a series of Medallions etching which earned him some trouble with certain fellow of actresses of whom he had drawn very unflattering portraits.

When Commerson sold the Tintamarre to Touchatout and revived the Tam-Tam in 1872, Bapaume followed him and wrote there articles under the name "Commodore". Like the Tintamarre, the Tam-Tam was "the newspaper of choice for the insane fantasy and jokes with punch." This unbridled imagination and cheerfully mocking tone are found in La Rome tintamarresque, histoire drolatique et anecdotique de Rome depuis sa fondation jusqu'au moyen âge et de Napoléon Ier, histoire tamtamarresque du grand homme, that Bapaume published between 1870 and 1872. After he became both the owner and chief editor of the Tam-Tam after Commerson died in 1879, he continued to publish novels into old age.

Works 
Theatre
1863: Les Égarements de deux billets de banque, two-act comédie en vaudeville, Paris, Théâtre Déjazet, 16 January
1864: La Vengeance de Pistache, one-act vaudeville, with Commerson, Paris, Théâtre Déjazet, 26 May
1866: Doña Framboisias, one-act folie-vaudeville, with Commerson, Paris, Théâtre des Folies-Marigny, 6 July
1867: Les Vacances de Cadichet, one-act vaudeville, with Commerson, Paris, Théâtre des Folies-Dramatiques, 22 July
1869: X. Q. P. G., one-act vaudeville, Paris, Théâtre des Folies-Dramatiques, 9 March
Varia
1846: Un Anniversaire. Anniversaire du 13 juillet 1842 Text online
1847: Juana la Lionne, ou les Jeunes gens d'aujourd'hui, novel, 3 vol. Text online 1 2
1852: Oncles et Neveux, ou Rome sous Jules César et Auguste et la France sous Napoléon Bonaparte et Louis-Napoléon, play in verse, Text online
1870: La Rome tintamarresque, histoire drôlatique et anecdotique de Rome depuis sa fondation jusqu'au moyen âge, foreword by Commerson
1872: Napoléon Ier, histoire tamtamarresque du grand homme, foreword by Commerson
1878: Cœur de lionne, novel
1882:Les Requins de Paris, novel
1888: Le Cocher de la duchesse, novel

References

Sources 
 Angelo De Gubernatis, Dictionnaire international des écrivains du jour, Florence, L. Niccolai, t. 1, 1888, (p. 147).

19th-century French dramatists and playwrights
19th-century French journalists
French male journalists
19th-century French novelists
Writers from Normandy
1825 births
1895 deaths
19th-century French male writers